The 2015 Louisiana gubernatorial election was held on November 21, 2015, to elect the governor of Louisiana. Incumbent Republican Governor Bobby Jindal was not eligible to run for re-election to a third term because of term limits established by the Louisiana Constitution.

Under Louisiana's jungle primary system, all candidates appeared on the same ballot, regardless of party and voters may vote for any candidate, regardless of their party affiliation. As no candidate received a majority of the vote during the primary election on October 24, 2015, a runoff election was held on November 21, 2015, between the top two candidates in the primary. Louisiana is the only state that has a jungle primary system (California and Washington have a similar "top two primary" system).

The runoff election featured Democrat John Bel Edwards, Minority Leader of the Louisiana House of Representatives, and Republican U.S. Senator David Vitter, as they were the top two vote getters in the primary. Lieutenant Governor Jay Dardenne and Public Service Commissioner Scott Angelle, both Republicans, were eliminated in the jungle primary.

In the runoff, which was held November 21, 2015, Edwards defeated Vitter by a count of 56.1% to 43.9%. Edwards became the first Democrat to win a statewide election in Louisiana since 2008, when Mary Landrieu won her third term in the United States Senate; his victory also came one year after national wins for the Republican Party in congressional and state elections. The election was one of the most expensive in state history, with over $50 million spent by candidates and outside groups.

Candidates

Republican Party

Filed
 Scott Angelle, Public Service Commissioner and former lieutenant governor of Louisiana
 Jay Dardenne, Lieutenant Governor of Louisiana
 David Vitter, U.S. Senator

Declined
 John Neely Kennedy, Louisiana State Treasurer (running for re-election)
 Newell Normand, Sheriff of Jefferson Parish (endorsed Dardenne)
 Michael G. Strain, Commissioner of Agriculture and Forestry (running for re-election)
 Rodney Alexander, former secretary of the Louisiana Department of Veterans Affairs and former U.S. Representative
 Burl Cain, Warden of the Louisiana State Penitentiary
 Gerald Long, state senator
 Buddy Roemer, former governor, former U.S. Representative and candidate for president in 2012

Democratic Party

Filed
 John Bel Edwards, Minority Leader of the Louisiana House of Representatives
 Cary Deaton, candidate for governor in 2011
 SL Simpson

Declined
 Mary Landrieu, former U.S. Senator, state treasurer and candidate for governor in 1995
 Mitch Landrieu, Mayor of New Orleans and former lieutenant governor of Louisiana
 John Georges, Businessman and independent candidate for governor in 2007
 Jason Williams, New Orleans City Council President
 Tony Clayton, prosecutor of the 18th Judicial District Court, member of the Southern University system board 
 James Bernhard, businessman
 Foster Campbell, Public Service Commissioner, former state senator and candidate for governor in 2007

Ineligible
 Edwin Edwards, former governor, U.S. Representative and state senator (ineligible due to 2000 felony convictions for bribery and racketeering)

Independents

Filed
 Beryl Billiot, restaurant owner and former Marine
 Jeremy Odom, minister
 Eric Paul Orgeron

Declined

 Melvin Slack, candidate for Mayor of Shreveport in 2014
 Russel L. Honoré, retired lieutenant general and former commander of Joint Task Force Katrina

Endorsements

Jungle primary

Polling

 * Internal poll for the John Kennedy campaign
 ** Internal poll for the John Bel Edwards campaign
 ^ Internal poll for the Jay Dardenne campaign

Results

Runoff

Campaign

A debate between Edwards and Vitter was held on November 10 by Louisiana Public Broadcasting and the Council for a Better Louisiana.

Early voting was possible from November 7 until November 14. Despite having one fewer day due to Veterans Day, turnout was significantly higher compared to the primary election early voting, especially among black voters and in urban parishes.

Debates
Complete video of debate, November 10, 2015

Predictions

Polling

*Internal poll for the John Bel Edwards campaign

Dardenne vs. Landrieu

Duke vs. Edwards

Vitter vs. Landrieu

Results
Edwards' win was the first statewide win for Democrats in Louisiana since Mary Landrieu won a third term to the Senate in 2008. He performed surprisingly well for a Democratic candidate in Louisiana, given that the Cook PVI for the state was R+12 at the time of the election and most Republican candidates won in landslides in prior statewide elections. He performed especially well in Caddo Parish (home of Shreveport), East Baton Rouge Parish, (home of Baton Rouge), and in the reliably Democratic Orleans Parish, (home of New Orleans). Turnout was slightly higher in the November run-off than in the October jungle primary.

By congressional district
Edwards won 5 of 6 congressional districts.

See also
2015 United States gubernatorial elections
Governors of Louisiana

References

External links
David Vitter for Governor 
John Bel Edwards for Governor 

Governor
2015
2015 United States gubernatorial elections
November 2015 events in the United States